is a railway station on the Shinano Railway Line in the city of Chikuma, Nagano, Japan, operated by the third-sector railway operating company Shinano Railway.

Lines
Yashiro Station is served by the Shinano Railway Line and is 59.9 kilometers from the starting point of the line at Karuizawa Station.

Station layout
The station consists of one ground-level island platform and one side platform serving three tracks, connected to the station building by a footbridge.

Platforms

Adjacent stations

History 
Yashiro Station opened on 15 August 1888. The Nagano Electric Railway Yashiro Line also served this station from 10 June 1922 to 31 March 2012.

Passenger statistics
In fiscal 2011, the station was used by an average of 4,464 passengers daily.

Surrounding area
Chikuma City Hall
Chikuma Post Office
 Yashiro-Minami High School

See also
List of railway stations in Japan

References

External links
  

Railway stations in Japan opened in 1888
Railway stations in Nagano Prefecture
Shinano Railway Line
Nagano Electric Railway
Chikuma, Nagano